Myotubularin related protein 14 also known as MTMR14 is a protein which in humans is encoded by the MTMR14  gene.

Function 

Expression of Mtmr14 increased with myotubule formation and differentiation.  MTMR14 is a phosphatidylinositol-3-phosphatase that dephosphorylates the same substrates as myotubularin, PtdIns(3)P and PtdIns(3,5)P2.

Clinical significance 

Mutations in the MTMR14 gene are associated with myotubular myopathy.

References

Further reading